General Holm may refer to:

Jeanne M. Holm (1921–2010), U.S. Air Force major general
Karl Eric Holm (1919–2016), Swedish Army lieutenant general
Norbert Holm (1895–1962), German Wehrmacht major general

See also
General Holmes (disambiguation)